The Wanderer is a fantasy drama television miniseries of a British origin, first transmitted on Sky One from 14 September to 7 December 1994, and comprising 13 hour-long episodes.<ref name="B">"The Wanderer", TV Zone Magazine, October 1994 (pp. 26-29).</ref>

Every episode brings a new adventure, and the story of long-ago brothers Adam and Zachary, Princess Beatrice, and Lady Clare slowly unfolds as the present-day Adam searches for the original Zachary's grave, a magic stone, and a lost book of power.

Premise
The central characters of the programme were created, and its core format was developed, by Tom Gabbay, who also served as executive producer of the series, which was filmed on locations in Austria, Germany, Spain, and England, including Chinatown in London, Helmsley Castle and the Yorkshire Moors, made by FingerTip Films (a partnership between Roy Clarke, who wrote the scripts, and producer Steve Lanning) for Yorkshire Television with British Sky Broadcasting (United Kingdom), ZDF (Germany), and Antena 3 (Spain). Bob Mahoney directed Rebirth, the first episode of the series.

In the United States, The Wanderer was transmitted primarily in first-run syndication.

Opening narration
Beginning for the first episode:

Beginning from episodes 2 to 13:

Plot summary
The shy multi-millionaire businessman Adam ("the Wanderer" of the programme's title) and his wicked twin brother Zachary (both played by Brown) are two former knights from the late 10th century during the Middle Ages at the end of the 1st millennium, both of whom have been born again (or reincarnated) in the late 20th century. Zachary is after a complicated revenge on Adam, who killed him in the year A.D. 1000, but much more is at stake than mere vengeance. As the turn of the 3rd millennium is approaching, people are growing more superstitious, and Zachary plans to use this for his own purpose. He needs his brother Adam dead, and Adam's death to be seen by witnesses, so he can pose as Adam resurrected.

The other players in both time-zones are Zachary's beautiful but deadly companion Beatrice (played by Thomson), Adam's friend Godbold (in the present day a philosophically-minded plumber and professional wrestler with a large beard, but once a hermit and monk, played by Haygarth), and Adam's 10th century lover Lady Clare (played by Moore). She has come back in the present day as Clare, a high-spirited photographer, and she does not plan to lose her man a second time.

Wolfgang Mathias (played by Tausig) is Adam's personal assistant. Unfortunately for him, as he himself has no roots in the 10th century, he finds virtually everything about the Wanderer's world extremely confusing.

Cast
Main characters

Notable guest stars

Episode list

Home media availability
ITV Studios Home Entertainment, owners of the copyright to The Wanderer, was not known to have released it on home media in any format as of the beginning of August 2014.

ReceptionTV Zone magazine, surveying the ratings for TV shows aired on Sky One, noted that The Wanderer's debut episode was watched by 0.46 million UK viewers. Subsequently, the show's episodes had lower ratings, gaining fewer viewers than Sky One's showings of Star Trek: The Next Generation and Highlander: The Series. The magazine concluded "Unless it [The Wanderer] performs well in other territories, a long life is not expected".   According to TV historian Milly Buonanno, The Wanderer was "an absolute failure according to audience ratings". Unhappy with the show's performance, ZDF ceased showing The Wanderer'' after the third episode.

See also
 Middle Ages in popular culture
 Reincarnation in popular culture
 1994 in British television

References

External links
 

Sky UK original programming
1994 British television series debuts
1994 British television series endings
1990s British drama television series
British fantasy television series
Television series by ITV Studios
Television series by Yorkshire Television
1990s British television miniseries
English-language television shows
Television about magic